The Saturn Cycling Team was an American cycling team that existed from 1992 to 2003. It was managed by Tom Schuler and sponsored by the Saturn Corporation.

Victories

1995
United States National Road Race Championships, Norman Alvis
United States National Criterium Championships, Frank McCormack
Killington Stage Race, Frank McCormack

1996
Giro del Capo, Scott Mercier
Tour de Toona, Scott Mercier
International Cycling Classic, Fred Rodriguez

1997
United States National Road Race Championships, Bart Bowen
United States National Cyclo-cross Championships, Mark McCormack
Herald Sun Tour, Norman Alvis
Tour de Toona, Norman Alvis
Tour of Japan, Bart Bowen

1998
International Cycling Classic, Frank McCormack
Tour of Japan, Frank McCormack
Fitchburg Longsjo Classic, Frank McCormack

1999
Fitchburg Longsjo Classic, Bart Bowen
Tour de Beauce, Levi Leipheimer
Sea Otter Classic, Frank McCormack

2000
Joe Martin Stage Race, Erin Hartwell
Lancaster Classic, Trent Klasna
Killington Stage Race, Chris Wherry

2001
United States National Time Trial Championships, Trent Klasna
Canadian National Time Trial Championships, Eric Wohlberg
United States National Criterium Championships, Harm Jansen
Tour de Toona, Harm Jansen
Redlands Bicycle Classic, Trent Klasna
Sea Otter Classic, Trent Klasna
Nature Valley Grand Prix, Frank McCormack
Fitchburg Longsjo Classic, Eric Wohlberg
Mount Washington Hillclimb, Tim Johnson

2002
Canadian National Road Race Championships, Eric Wohlberg
GP Weltour, Chris Fisher
International Cycling Classic, Viktor Rapinski
Tour de Nez, Eric Wohlberg

2003
United States National Road Race Championships, Mark McCormack
Canadian National Time Trial Championships, Eric Wohlberg
Sea Otter Classic, Nathan O'Neill
Fitchburg Longsjo Classic, Viktor Rapinski
International Cycling Classic, Viktor Rapinski
Redlands Bicycle Classic, Chris Horner
Tour de Georgia, Chris Horner
Herald Sun Tour, Tim Johnson
Nature Valley Grand Prix, Trent Klasna
Cascade Cycling Classic, Tom Danielson
Mount Washington Hillclimb, Tom Danielson
Pomona Valley Stage Race, Tom Danielson
Tour de Langkawi, Tom Danielson
Tour de Toona, Tom Danielson
Tour de Delta, William Frischkorn
San Francisco Grand Prix, Chris Horner

List of riders

References

Defunct cycling teams based in the United States
Cycling teams established in 1992
Cycling teams disestablished in 2003
1992 establishments in the United States
2003 disestablishments in the United States